This page lists board and card games, wargames, miniatures games, and tabletop role-playing games published in 1988.  For video games, see 1988 in video gaming.

Games invented or released in 1988

Game awards given in 1988
 Spiel des Jahres: Barbarossa

Deaths

See also
 1988 in video gaming

Games
Games by year